J32 may refer to:
 J/32, an American sailboat design
 British Aerospace Jetstream J32, a British airliner
 Chronic sinusitis
 Honda J32, an automobile engine
 Malaysia Federal Route J32
 Nissan Teana J32, a Japanese sedan
 Pentagonal orthocupolarotunda, a Johnson solid (J32)
 Saab J 32 Lansen, a Swedish attack aircraft
 Westinghouse J32, an American jet engine
 LNER Class J32, a class of British steam locomotives